Oakland Beach is a neighborhood and beach located in the South Central area of Warwick, Rhode Island, on Greenwich Bay, a tributary of Narragansett Bay.  In the late 1800s, Oakland Beach was the site of the camp ground for the six day annual training encampment of the Rhode Island Militia.  Around 1895 the encampment was moved to a larger and better equipped facility at Quonset Point.

This densely populated community of small cottages was developed after World War I as a summer colony, largely for nearby Providence's middle-class Irish, Greek and Italian communities.

Oakland Beach reached its heyday in the 1930s when it boasted a bathing beach, boat docks and restaurants, as well as a Ferris wheel, and rail service to Providence and other nearby summer colonies. Popular local attractions included an arcade, carousel (merry go round) movie theater, bowling alley and dodgem cars, it also housed a skating rink run by the same people who ran the oldest family run skating rink in the country which replaced the one in Oakland Beach after the 1930s New England Hurricane.

The New England Hurricane of 1938, however, destroyed much of Oakland Beach. The area never quite recovered, and Hurricane Carol in 1954 added to the area's destruction. Over the years, Oakland Beach has become a destination where people come to attend the many activities on the green, park by the sea wall to enjoy the beautiful vista of Greenwich Bay, kayak the scenic coves, stroll the shoreline and dine at the restaurants. The most notable being Iggy's Doughboys and Chowderhouse, Iggy's Boardwalk and also Top of the Bay (which used to be the Governor's residence). New to the area is The Beach Cafe and Pub.

In the late 1980s a novelty song called Born in Oakland Beach was made which used the tune of Bruce Springsteen's ''Born in the USA.  It was played on local radio stations and referenced local landmarks like Veterans Memorial High School and Rocky Point.

References

External links
 Oakland Beach Slide Show

Neighborhoods in Rhode Island
Narragansett Bay
Populated coastal places in Rhode Island
Populated places in Providence County, Rhode Island